Plimptonville station  was an MBTA Commuter Rail station in Walpole, Massachusetts. It was located near the Neponset River next to a small dirt parking lot between Plimpton Street and the tracks. It was a flag stop on the Franklin Line, and received the least service of any MBTA station, with just one round trip per day, consisting of an inbound morning train and an outbound evening train at the height of rush hour. Ridership on that round trip averaged just 12 passengers daily by a 2018 count.

Station design
Plimptonville had one of the smallest station facilities on the MBTA Commuter Rail system: an approximately -wide low-level asphalt platform next to the single track, with a small gravel parking lot.

History

The Norfolk County Railroad was built through East Walpole beginning in 1846; it opened on April 23, 1849. Three stops were located in Walpole: West Walpole, and Plimpton(s) – also spelled Plympton(s) – adjacent to the Plimpton Iron Works near East Walpole. Commuting from the station to Boston was possible beginning in 1850. After several reorganizations and mergers, the line became part of the New York and New England Railroad (NY&NE) in 1873.

The station was renamed to Tilton(s) by the 1870s after the mill village changed names. A small station building, no longer extant, was located on the northwest side of the tracks. Double-tracking through the station to Walpole was completed in 1881. The NY&NE was taken over by the New Haven Railroad-controlled New England Railroad in 1895; the new railroad was leased by the New Haven in 1898. Around 1894, the name was changed again to Plimptonville (sometimes spelled Plymptonville).

MBTA era
The 1964-formed MBTA began subsidizing service on the route on April 24, 1966; it became the Franklin Line of the MBTA Commuter Rail system. The station had become less important under public ownership due to its lack of parking, rural location, and proximity to the well-used Walpole station. Additionally, the station was in the middle of a single-track section of the line, severely limiting the number of trains that can stop. The MBTA closed the stop on February 1, 1981 due to budget cuts, but soon reopened it due to protests by riders. The single round-trip served a small but dedicated contingent of riders. A planned project to double-track the line through the station was announced in November 2019.

The station was closed again on January 23, 2021 as part of the MBTA's "Forging Ahead" initiative, due to low ridership, operational impacts, and availability of alternatives, in response to the COVID-19 pandemic.

References

External links

MBTA - Plimptonville
Station from Google Maps Street View

Stations along New York and New England Railroad lines
MBTA Commuter Rail stations in Norfolk County, Massachusetts
Walpole, Massachusetts
Railway stations closed in 2020
1849 establishments in Massachusetts
Railway stations in the United States opened in 1849